The 80th Massachusetts General Court, consisting of the Massachusetts Senate and the Massachusetts House of Representatives, met in 1859 during the governorship of Nathaniel Prentice Banks. Charles A. Phelps served as president of the Senate and Charles Hale served as speaker of the House.

"In 1858 the Republicans took a firm grip on both branches of the Legislature electing 34 Senate members as against two Democrats and four other. The House went Republican by the widest margin ever with 314 Republicans and but three Democrats."

Senators

Representatives

See also
 36th United States Congress
 List of Massachusetts General Courts

References

Further reading
 
  (speech delivered February 17, 1859)

External links
 
 

Political history of Massachusetts
Massachusetts legislative sessions
massachusetts
1859 in Massachusetts